Pencho Georgiev (Bulgarian: Пенчо Георгиев; 1 February 1900, Vratsa – 2 April 1940, Sofia) was a Bulgarian painter, scenographer and illustrator, especially of children's books.

Biography 
His father died in the First Balkan War when he was only twelve. After the end of World War I, he moved to Sofia to study arts and crafts. In 1925, he graduated from the National Academy with a degree in "Applied and Decorative Arts" and began working as a set designer. His first project was The Queen of Spades by Tchaikovsky at the Sofia Opera. He stayed there for two years before moving on to the State Theater (known as the Dohodno Zdanie) in Ruse.

In 1929, he moved to Paris, where he copied the works of the Old Masters while making woodcuts and etchings. Later, he collaborated with the Russian painter Konstantin Korovin to create set decorations for productions of several Russian operas. He remained in Paris until 1932.

Upon returning to Bulgaria, he began illustrating books and creating interior designs for homes, as well as working on a number of public projects, creating over thirty set decorations at the Opera and the Ivan Vazov National Theatre. His paintings were done mostly in watercolors and pastels. His illustrations included some for the first works by Maxim Gorky published in Bulgarian. He also participated in many exhibitions, including the Salon d'Automne and the Milan Triennale.

In 1940, while working on decorations for Salammbô at the National Theater, he slipped and fell to his death down an elevator shaft on stage.

Selected works

References

Further reading
 Alexander Zitsman: По дирите на Пенчо Георгиев (In the Footsteps of Pencho Georgiev), Black Flamingo Press (2013)

External links

 Pencho Georgiev as an illustrator of children's books, with examples @ Kultura.
 110th Anniversary Exhibition in Ruse @ Darik News.
 Audio biography from the Sofia City Art Gallery @ YouTube

1900 births
1940 deaths
Bulgarian illustrators
Bulgarian scenic designers
People from Vratsa
Deaths from falls
19th-century Bulgarian painters
19th-century male artists
20th-century Bulgarian painters
20th-century male artists
Male painters